The 50th Academy of Country Music Awards were held on April 19, 2015, at the AT&T Stadium in Arlington, Texas. The ceremony was hosted by Luke Bryan and Blake Shelton. Nominations for the 50th Academy of Country Music Awards were announced on January 30, 2015.

Background 

The awards honored artists in its usual categories, but also honored Milestone winners. The ceremony broke a Guinness World Record, with 70,252 attendees, making it the highest attended Awards show to be broadcast.

Winners and nominees 
The winners are shown in bold.

References

Academy of Country Music Awards
Academy of Country Music Awards
Academy of Country Music Awards
Academy of Country Music Awards
Academy of Country Music Awards
Academy of Country Music Awards
Television shows directed by Glenn Weiss